Thorild Olsson (26 November 1886 – 19 March 1934) was a Swedish runner who competed in the 1912 Summer Olympics in Stockholm. He helped the Swedes win Silver in the men's 3000 m teams race. Each team consisted of 5 runners starting simultaneously but only the placings of the first 3 in each team counted. The final consisted of teams from USA, Sweden and Great Britain. USA won the event with places 1, 3 and 5 while the Swedes with Thorild Olsson 2nd, Ernst Wide 4th and Bror Fock 7th took silver. Olsson's time of 8:44.6 would have been a world record before the 1912 games. (Translated from Swedish by his grandson who has seen photo's of him finishing second.)

References

{{
}}

1886 births
1934 deaths
Swedish male long-distance runners
Olympic athletes of Sweden
Athletes (track and field) at the 1912 Summer Olympics
Olympic silver medalists for Sweden
Olympic silver medalists in athletics (track and field)
Medalists at the 1912 Summer Olympics
Athletes from Gothenburg